San Tin Village or San Tin Tsuen, sometimes referred to as San Tin Wai, is a village in Tai Wai, Sha Tin District, Hong Kong, located south of Che Kung Temple and east of Sun Chui Estate.

Administration
San Tin Wai is a recognized village under the New Territories Small House Policy.

History
San Tin Village was historically a single-clan village of the Lau, and it now features the Lau Ancestral Hall. The Lau were Hakkas who first moved from Huizhou to Au Pui Wan Tsuen near Grassy Hill, northwest of Sha Tin, during the 18th century. They were farmers engaged in cultivation. As their population increased, they bought a piece of land from the Kak Tin and Tin Sam villages and established a new village called 'San Tin' (lit. "new field") in the late 1890s. At the time of the 1911 census, the population of San Tin was 109.

See also
 Kau Yeuk (Sha Tin)
 Che Kung Temple, a temple located next to San Tin Village
 Sun Tin Wai Estate

References

External links

 Delineation of area of existing village San Tin (Sha Tin) for election of resident representative (2019 to 2022)
 Antiquities Advisory Board. Pictures of Lau Ancestral Hall, No. 26 San Tin Village, Sha Tin

Villages in Sha Tin District, Hong Kong
Tai Wai